Red Canyon is a valley in the U.S. state of Nevada.

Red Canyon was named from the reddish character of its hills.

References

Valleys of Douglas County, Nevada